William Betts (died 1738) of Epsom, Surrey was a British merchant, financier and Whig  politician who sat in the House of Commons between 1710 and 1730

Betts was raised by the family of George Dodington of Eastbury,  Dorset, but his origins are unknown. He became a very successful London merchant and financier and made a fortune through directorships and other means.

Betts was invited by local Whigs to stand for parliament at  Weymouth and Melcombe Regis, but it was a frustrating journey for him. At the 1710 general election he was returned as Member of Parliament after a contest,  but his election was declared void on 17 March 1711 after allegations of bribery. This resulted in a by-election on 18 April 1711, in which he topped the poll, but was unseated on petition on 22 May 1711. Also in May, he was elected as a Director of the East India Company, and by this time held some £4,000 worth of Bank of England stock. At the 1713 general election  he was elected  MP for Weymouth for the third time, but after voting against the expulsion of Richard Steele on 18 March 1714, was unseated on petition on 3 June 1714.

Betts was returned for Weymouth at the 1715 general election and this time kept the seat for a whole parliament, sitting on the Dodington interest. He voted against the Administration on the septennial bill but with them on the repeal of the Occasional Conformity and Schism Acts, and he voted against the Peerage Bill. He was returned unopposed at the 1722 general election. 
 
In  1727 Betts was again returned after a contest. He did not vote on the civil list arrears in 1729. In 1730 the House considered a petition from Knox Ward claiming that Betts's election should be declared void on technical grounds. Betts was by this time infirm and unable to attend the House and declared the electors should be given an opportunity to make another choice. He did not stand at the by-election. 

Betts died unmarried 14 March 1738, leaving £5,000 to George Bubb Dodington and £2,000 to Thomas Wyndham, both nephews of George Dodington, and £1,000 to John Tucker.

References

1738 deaths
Members of the Parliament of Great Britain for English constituencies
British MPs 1710–1713
British MPs 1713–1715
British MPs 1715–1722
British MPs 1722–1727
British MPs 1727–1734